Trophon patagonicus is a species of sea snail, a marine gastropod mollusk in the family Muricidae, the murex snails or rock snails.

Description
The shell can grow to be 30 mm to 55 mm in length.

Distribution
It can be found in the southern Atlantic Ocean off the coast of Argentina.

References

Gastropods described in 1839
Trophon